The following are railway stations in Pakistan.

Azad Kashmir

Balochistan 

 Aab-e-Gum railway station
 Bukhtiarabad Domki railway station
 Chaman railway station
 Dalbandin railway station
 Damboli railway station 
 Dera Allah Yar railway station
 Dera Murad Jamali railway station
 Dingra railway station 
 Dozan railway station
 Hirok railway station
 Koh-e-Taftan railway station
 Kolpur railway station
 Mach railway station
 Mangoli railway station 
 Mushkaf railway station
 Nushki railway station
 Nuttall railway station
 Panir railway station 
 Perak railway station
 Quetta railway station
 Sar-I-Ab railway station
 Spezand railway station
 Shela Bagh railway station
 Sibi railway station
 Spezand Junction railway station

Gilgit-Baltistan

Islamabad Capital Territory 
 Islamabad
 Golra Sharif Jn

Khyber Pakhtunkhwa 
 Havelian railway station
 Kohat Tehsil railway station
 Nowshera Junction railway station
 Peshawar Cantonment railway station
 Landi Khana railway station
 Landi Kotal railway station
 Jamrud railway station
 Shahgai railway station
 Kabul River railway station
 Kahi railway station
 Other stations: Baldher, Haripur, Jahangira Road, Kot Najeeb Ullah, Nizampur, Pabbi, Peshawar City
 Dysfunctional: Bannu, Charsadda, Dara Pezu, Dargai, Lakki Marwat, Mardan, Rashakai, Tajezai, Tank, Jhandi railway station

Punjab

Sindh 
Bhit Shah

 
Darbelo
Dolatpur Safan
 
 
Halani
Hala
 
 
 
 
 
 
 
Kandiaro
 
 
 
 
 
 
 
 
Qazi Ahmed
 
 
 
 
 
 
 
 
 
 
 
 
 
 
 
  Tharu Shah Junction
 
 Hala

Complete alphabetical list 

1 Ab-I-Gum railway station (ABG)
 Aba Khel railway station (ABK)
 Abad railway station (AAD)
 Abbasnagar railway station (ABNR)
 Abbaspur railway station (AHR)
 Abdul Hakim railway station (XG)
 Abdullahabad Halt railway station (AABD)
 Abdullahpur Kolar railway station (ABDK)
 Ablak railway station (ABL)
 Adam Khan railway station (ADKM)
 Adamshaba railway station (ASA)
 Adamwahan Bridge railway station (ADB)
 Admwahan railway station (ADW)
 Ahmedwal railway station (AHW)
 Air Ship Halt railway station (APSH)
 Airport Halt Railway Station (APRT)
 Ajnala railway station (AAJ)
 Akhtarabad railway station (AKHB)
 Akora Khattak railway station (AKO)
 Ala railway station (ALA)
 Aladana railway station (ADZ)
 Alam Reg railway station (ALG)
 Alamgir Town Halt railway station (ALRT)
 Alhar railway station (ALX)
 Ali Muhammad Mihar Halt railway station (AMMR)
 Ali Nawaz Ghoto Halt railway station (ANGH)
 Alipur Chatta railway station (ACHH)
 Alipur Sayadan Sharif railway station (ASY)
 Alisar Halt railway station (ALIS)
 Allahdad Rahu railway station (ALHU)
 Allahdadani railway station (ADN)
 Allahdino Sand railway station (ADS)
 Alluwali railway station (AWI)
 Alozai railway station (ALZ)
 Amirpur Halt railway station (AMRR)
 Ammiunttion Siding railway station (AMSB)
 Amri railway station (AMR)
 Amruka railway station (AMK)
 Aqilshah railway station (AKSH)
 Arian Road railway station (AOD)
 Arif Wala railway station (ARF)
 Arsala Khan railway station (ARSK)
 Ashanpur railway station (AHP)
 Ashraf Shah railway station (AFS)
 Asrani railway station (ANN)
 Athilpur railway station (AHU)
 Attock City Junction railway station (ATCY)
 Attock Khurd railway station (ATKD)
 Attock-Khurd railway station (ATK)
 Azad railway station (AZT)
 Azmatwala railway station (AZTL)
 Babakwal railway station (BBKW)
 Babar Kachh railway station (BBH)
 Babari Banda railway station (BJB)
 Badah railway station (BDR)
 Badal Nala railway station (BDNL)
 Badami Bagh railway station (BBG)
 Baddomalhi railway station (BDML)
 Badin railway station (BDX)
 Badinzai railway station (BDZI)
 Badli Mazari railway station (BIZI)
 Baghdad railway station (BGHD)
 Bagiarari railway station (BGRI)
 Bahalike railway station (BKZ)
 Bahawalnagar Junction railway station (BWU)
 Bahawalpur railway station (BWPR)
 Bahram Hathiun railway station (BRHN)
 Bahrianwala railway station (BZW)
 Bahuman railway station (BHMN)
 Bajwa railway station (BJWA)
 Bakhsh Jatoi railway station (BKJT)
 Bakhshan Khan railway station (BKK)
 Bakhshapur railway station (BXZ)
 Bakhtiarabad Domki railway station (BKDK)
 Bakrala railway station (BKRA)
 Bakrani Road railway station (BKR)
 Baldher railway station (BZD)
 Baldia railway station (BDAA)
 Balishah railway station (BSF)
 Balochabad railway station (BLBD)
 Balochpur railway station (BLOR)
 Bandhi railway station (BHE)
 Bandial railway station (BQD)
 Banh Mianwala Halt railway station (BMWL)
 Banni Bangla railway station (BBNG)
 Bannu railway station (BXU)
 Barag Khurd railway station (BFK)
 Barocho railway station (BRBG)
 Baruli railway station (BRLY)
 Basal Junction railway station (BOS)
 Basirpur railway station (BSU)
 Basti Abdullah railway station (BLAH)
 Basti Dad Halt railway station (BSTD)
 Basti Darwesh Lashari railway station (BSHL)
 Basti Fauja railway station (BIFA)
 Basti Qutab railway station (BQS)
 Basti Rahman railway station (BRN)
 Begmanji railway station (BGE)
 Begowala railway station (BGW)
 Behal railway station (BEL)
 Behkari Halt railway station (BHRI)
 Beleli railway station (BLI)
 Bell-Pat railway station (BPT)
 Bero Chandia railway station (BRCD)
 Bhakkar railway station (BHKR)
 Bhalwal railway station (BWQ)
 Bhan Syedabad railway station (BAN)
 Bhera railway station (BHH)
 Bhila Hithar railway station (BZH)
 Bhiria Road railway station (BRO)
 Bhit Shah Railway Station (BTSH)
 Bhoe Asal railway station [closed] (BOC)
 Bholari railway station (BOL)
 Bhumb railway station (BHMB)
 Bhun railway station (BVX)
 Bhurgri Railway Station (BHGR)
 Bijirani railway station (BJNI)
 Bilao railway station (BFO)
 Bin Qasim railway station (BQM)
 Bobi Road railway station (BBIR)
 Bohar railway station (BOU)
 Bolan railway station (BJC)
 Bostan Junction railway station (BTN)
 Boundary Pillar railway station (NP72)
 Braudabad railway station (BKB)
 Bubak Road railway station (BUK)
 Buch railway station (BUC)
 Bucheri railway station (BCR)
 Buchiana railway station (BCX)
 Budapur railway station (BDP)
 Budh railway station (BVD)
 Budho railway station (BUO)
 Bug railway station (BUZ)
 Burhan railway station (BUN)
 Burj railway station (BURJ)
 Bustan Afghanan railway station (BSAN)
 Cadet Collage Petaro railway station (CCQ)
 Cadet College Kohat railway station (KTCT)
 Cement Factory Siding railway station (CFS)
 Chabiana railway station (CBA)
 Chachar railway station (CCRB)
 Chachran railway station (CCN)
 Chaghi railway station (GNGI)
 Chah Nur Muhammad railway station (CNQ)
 Chak railway station (CAK)
 Chak Abdullah railway station (CAL)
 Chak Amru railway station (CKRU)
 Chak Asmat Ullah Halt railway station (CHAA)
 Chak Ibrahim Bhatti railway station (COB)
 Chak Jhumra Junction railway station (CKJ)
 Chak Jhumra West Cabin railway station (WOC)
 Chak Kambo railway station (CKQ)
 Chaklala railway station (CKL)
 Chak Naurang railway station (CKNG)
 Chak Nizam railway station (CKZ)
 Chak Pirana railway station (CPI)
 Chak Saida railway station (CKSA)
 Chak Saiyiadanwala Halt railway station (CHWA)
 Chak Turan railway station (CHTR)
 Chak Waraichanwala railway station (CWW)
 Chakwal railway station (CWK)
 Chalisa Junction railway station (CHS)
 Chaman railway station (CMN)
 Chandrami railway station (CDRN)
 Chanesar railway station (CHNS)
 Chang railway station (CHNG)
 Changa Manga railway station (CGM)
 Chanigot railway station (CNG)
 Channa Halt railway station (CHAN)
 Charnali railway station (CRH)
 Charsadda railway station (CSD)
 Chauntra railway station (CTN)
 Chaweka Road railway station (CAD)
 Chawinda railway station (CWD)
 Chenab Nagar railway station (CNR)
 Chenab West Bank railway station (CWB)
 Chet Singhwala railway station (CGW)
 Chhab railway station (CBB)
 Chhor railway station (COH)
 Chichawatni railway station (CCE)
 Chichoki Mallian railway station (CCM)
 Chidarzai railway station (CDZ)
 Chikarkot railway station (CKO)
 Chilianwala railway station (CHW)
 Chinot railway station (CHOT)
 Chistian railway station (CSI)
 Choa Kariala railway station (CKRL)
 Chrome Halt railway station (CH)
 Chukhra railway station (CUA)
 Chund railway station (CUH)
 Chur Sharif Halt railway station (CHSF)
 Churmian railway station [closed] (CRE)
 Chutiana railway station (CUN)
 Dabanawala railway station (DBX)
 Dabheji railway station (DBJ)
 Dad Fatihana railway station (DDH)
 Dadu railway station (DDU)
 Daharki railway station (DRK)
 Daira Mahram railway station (DRMM)
 Dajd Halt railway station (DXA)
 Dajlatpur Safan railway station (DPSN)
 Dalbandin railway station (DLH)
 Dalipota railway station (THC)
 Dalujal railway station (DLJ)
 Damboli railway station (DMB)
 Dandot  railway station (DRS)
 Dar Ul Ihsan railway station (DRLN)
 Darbar Shab Kartarpur railway station (DSKR)
 Darbelo railway station (DRBO)
 Dari Azim Khan Halt railway station (DRAK)
 Darkhana railway station (DKH)
 Darsmand railway station (DSV)
 Darya Khan railway station (DYN)
 Daud Khel Junction railway station (DKL)
 Daulatala railway station (DTU)
 Daur railway station (DOU)
 Deabakha railway station (BKE)
 Deona Juliani railway station (DEN)
 Deparja railway station (DPJA)
 Departure Yard railway station (DPY)
 Depot Hill railway station (DPHL)
 Dera Allahyar railway station (DAHR)
 Dera Dinpanah railway station (DNP)
 Dera Ghazi Khan railway station (DGK)
 Dera Murad Jamali railway station (DMJJ)
 Dera Nawab Sahib railway station (DWBS)
 Dera Taj railway station (DRTJ)
 Detha railway station (DET)
 Dhab Sanateka railway station (DBST)
 Dhaban Singh railway station (DNS)
 Dhak railway station (DAK)
 Dhandi railway station (DDI)
 Dharowal Kang Halt railway station (DAWK)
 Dhaunkal railway station (DUX)
 Dher Ummid Ali railway station (DHUA)
 Dhjdial railway station (DIZ)
 Dholan railway station (DOLN)
 Dhoro Naro railway station (DNO)
 Dhrema railway station [closed] (DHRM)
 Digri railway station (DII)
 Dilmurad railway station (DMQ)
 Dina railway station (DIN)
 Dinapur railway station (DINA)
 Dinga railway station (DGH)
 Dingra railway station (DNF)
 Doaba railway station (DOV)
 Doctor Chah railway station (DRC)
 Domala railway station (DMLA)
 Domel railway station (DOME)
 Domeli railway station (DMI)
 Dorata railway station (DTA)
 Dost Muhammad Abad railway station (DMAH)
 Dost Pura Halt railway station (DSTB)
 Dozan railway station (DZN)
 Drakki railway station (DKK)
 Drig Road railway station (DID)
 Drigh Colony railway station (DCL)
 Dungabunga railway station (DNBA)
 Dunyapur railway station (DYR)
 Durgai railway station (DRY)
 Dyz railway station (DYZ)
 Eminabad railway station (EMBD)
 Faisalabad railway station (FSLD)
 Faisalabad Dry Port railway station (FDP)
 Faiz Muhammad Manahi Halt railway station (FZM)
 Faqir Hussain Shaheed railway station (FQHD)
 Faqirabad railway station (FQB)
 Faqirwali railway station (FQL)
 Farid Nagar railway station [closed] (FNR)
 Farm Noor Muhammad railway station (FNM)
 Farooq Abad railway station (FRQD)
 Farooqia railway station (FRQ)
 Fateh Shahpur Halt railway station (FSRR)
 Fatehjang railway station (FJG)
 Fazal Bhambro railway station (FZB)
 Fazilpur Dhandi railway station (FZDI)
 Fertilizer Factory railway station (FFSH)
 Firoza railway station (FRA)
 Fort Abbas railway station (FPA)
 Gadalar railway station (GRR)
 Gaddar railway station (GDR)
 Gagan railway station (GGK)
 Gagoo railway station (GOO)
 Gajargola railway station (GGL)
 Galangur railway station (GAN)
 Galangur Kotal railway station (GLRK)
 Gambat railway station (GBT)
 Ganda Singhwala railway station (GSS)
 Gandi Khan Khel railway station [closed] (GNQ)
 Ganja Takkar railway station (GJT)
 Garhi Khairo railway station (GRK)
 Gat railway station (GUZ)
 Gatti railway station (GTZ)
 Ghakka Mittar railway station (GKMI)
 Ghakkhar Mandi railway station (GKR)
 Gharo railway station (GHO)
 Ghjrazai railway station [closed] (GZI)
 Ghoriwala railway station (GWR)
 Ghotki railway station (GHK)
 Ghribwal railway station (GBW)
 Ghulamabad railway station (GABD)
 Ghungrila railway station (GNX)
 Gidu railway station (GAB)
 Gilani railway station (GLAN)
 Gilawala railway station (GLW)
 Gilmala Halt railway station (GML)
 Girdhariwala railway station (GHW)
 Gojra railway station (GJA)
 Golpur railway station (GPE)
 Golra railway station (GOL)
 Golra Sharif Junction railway station (GLRS)
 Golra Sharif Railway Museum situated at Golra Sharif Junction railway station
 Goolpur Talbani railway station (GTB)
 Gopang railway station (GPG)
 Gosarji railway station (GSRJ)
 Goth Shah Muhammad railway station (GSM)
 Gujar Garhi railway station (GJGR)
 Gujar Khan railway station (GKN)
 Gujjar railway station (GUJR)
 Gujranwala railway station (GRW)
 Gujranwala Cant railway station (GRWC)
 Gujranwala City railway station (GLCY)
 Gujrat railway station (GRT)
 Gul Beg Marri railway station (GBM)
 Gul Imam railway station (GLX)
 Gul Sher railway station (GLS)
 Gulistan railway station (GTN)
 Gullar Pir Halt railway station (GLPR)
 Gunna Kalan railway station (GKO)
 Gurmani railway station (GUI)
 Gwal railway station [closed] (GWX)
 Habib Kot Junction railway station (HBKJ)
 Habibabad railway station (HBAD)
 Hafeezabad railway station (HFED)
 Hafizabad railway station (HFD)
 Haibat Shahid railway station (HTS)
 Haidar Jatoi railway station (HJTI)
 Haji Chand railway station (HJC)
 Haji Muhammad Ihan Halt railway station (HMX)
 Hakimani Halt railway station (HISD)
 Hala railway station (HLA)
 Halloki Halt railway station (HLO)
 Hamdaniwala Halt railway station (HMLA)
 Hanapur railway station (HNPR)
 Hangu railway station (HGU)
 Haranpur Junction railway station (HNP)
 Harappa railway station (HAP)
 Harbanspura railway station (HBR)
 Hariah railway station (HRA)
 Haripur Band railway station (HPD)
 Haripur Hazara railway station (HRU)
 Harnai railway station (HUR)
 Harnal railway station (HRNL)
 Harunabad railway station (HRND)
 Haryanwala railway station (HYN)
 Hasan Abdal railway station (HSN)
 Hasan Rind railway station (HSNR)
 Hasilpur railway station (HSU)
 Hasisar railway station (HSS)
 Hassim Killi railway station (KMKI)
 Hastedpur railway station (HSTD)
 Hathiyan railway station (HTN)
 Hattar railway station (HTTR)
 Haveli Wasawewala railway station (HWSW)
 Havelian And Out Agency railway station (HVN)
 Hayat Sher Pao Shahid railway station (HSPS)
 Hazarat Karanwala railway station (HKW)
 Hazart Shama Ghaus Halt railway station (HSGH)
 Hazurpur railway station (HZP)
 Hingoro Road Halt railway station (HGO)
 Hira Singh railway station (HSG)
 Hiral railway station (HAL)
 Hirok railway station (HRK)
 Hngu Camp railway station (HGC)
 Humayun railway station (HMN)
 Hump Yard railway station (HY)
 Humunwala railway station (HWA)
 Husri railway station (HSE)
 Hyderabad Junction railway station (HDR)
 Ibrahim Kachhi Halt railway station (IBKI)
 Ibrahimzai railway station [closed] (IMZ)
 Imamia Colony railway station (IMNY)
 Import Yard railway station (IY)
 Injra railway station (IJA)
 Iqbal Nagar railway station (IQP)
 Isa Khel railway station (IKH)
 Isa Tahir railway station (ITH)
 Islamia College railway station (IMC)
 Ismaili railway station (IMI)
 Jacobabad Junction railway station (JCD)
 Jafarabad Halt railway station (JSA)
 Jafarwala railway station (JFW)
 Jahania railway station (JAI)
 Jajja Abbasian railway station (JJH)
 Jalal Marri railway station (JLMR)
 Jallo railway station (JLO)
 Jalu-Jo-Chunrd railway station (JLU)
 Jam Sahib railway station (JMSB)
 Jaman Shah railway station (JNS)
 Jamke Chatta railway station (JCT)
 
 Jampur railway station (JMPR)
 Jamraniwah railway station (JMH)
 Jamrao Junction railway station (JMO)
 Jamrud Junction railway station (JRD)
 Jan Muhammad Wala railway station (JMW)
 Jand Junction railway station (JAD)
 Jangal Mariala railway station (JMY)
 Janiwala railway station (JWA)
 Jarala railway station (JRF)
 Jaranwala railway station (JNW)
 Jassar Junction railway station (JSAR)
 Jatoi railway station (JTOI)
 Jauharabad railway station (JAHD)
 Jaurah Karnana railway station (JRH)
 Jhalar railway station (JRN)
 Jhamat railway station (JHMT)
 Jhang City railway station (JHC)
 Jhang Sadar railway station (JGH)
 Jhangira Road railway station (JHR)
 Jhatpat railway station (JPT)
 Jhelum railway station (JMR)
 Jhetha Bhutta railway station (JTA)
 Jhimpir railway station (JHP)
 Jhok Ditta railway station (JWT)
 Jhol railway station (JHO)
 Jhudo railway station (JDO)
 Jhuluri railway station (JLE)
 Jia Bagga railway station (JBA)
 Jummah Goth railway station (JMTH)
 Jungshahi railway station (JGS)
 Kabul River railway station (KVB)
 Kabul Seen Pul railway station (KBSP)
 Kacha Ghari railway station (KGC)
 Kacha Khuh railway station (KHO)
 Kacha Road railway station (KCR)
 Kachelo railway station (KEO)
 Kahal railway station (KHL)
 Kahi railway station (KHY)
 Kahror Pakka railway station (KQP)
 Kala railway station (KAX)
 Kala Khatai railway station (KLKT)
 Kala Shah Kaku railway station (KBS)
 Kalabagh railway station (KWZ)
 Kalanchwala railway station (KCW)
 Kalas Goraya Halt railway station (KGRX)
 Kaleke railway station (KKE)
 Kalhora railway station (KLHR)
 Kaliamawan railway station (KWX)
 Kallur Kot railway station (KLO)
 Kalpani railway station (KPC)
 Kaluwal railway station (KOW)
 Kamalia railway station (KZM)
 Kamar Mashani railway station (KQH)
 Kamaro Sharif railway station (KMOS)
 Kambar Ali Khan railway station (KRAK)
 Kamoke railway station (KAM)
 Kan Mehtarzai railway station (KZZ)
 Kana Kacha railway station [closed] (KKH)
 Kanak railway station (KBF)
 Kandiaro railway station (KDRO)
 Kandkot railway station (KFZ)
 Kandwal Halt railway station (KDWL)
 Kanganpur railway station (KZN)
 Kanjur railway station (KUJ)
 Kanjwani railway station (KJK)
 Karachi Bunder And Sidings railway station (KBX)
 Karachi Cant railway station (KC)
 Karachi City railway station (KYC)
 Karachi Port Trust Halt railway station (KPT)
 Karachi University railway station (KYXU)
 Karor railway station (KOR)
 Karsaz railway station (KRSZ)
 Karyal Halt railway station (KRYL)
 Kashmor Colony railway station (KZLC)
 Kashmor Junction railway station (KZL)
 Kassowal railway station (KSL)
 Kasur Junction railway station (KUS)
 Kasur Tehsil railway station [closed] (KXS)
 Kata Kushta railway station (KKST)
 Kathala railway station (KTL)
 Kazi Ahmad railway station (KZO)
 Kechi Beg railway station (KFB)
 Khadrd railway station (KHDO)
 Khair Muhammad Laghari Halt railway station (KRMI)
 Khairabad Kund railway station (KBD)
 Khairpur railway station (KHP)
 Khan railway station (KAN)
 Khan Muhammad Chah railway station (QMX)
 Khanai railway station (KNI)
 Khanewal Junction railway station (KWL)
 Khanora railway station (KFR)
 Khanot railway station (KNOT)
 Khanpur Junction railway station (KPR)
 Khanqah Muhammad Panah railway station (KEM)
 Kharian railway station (KRN)
 Kharian Cant railway station (KRNC)
 Khatan railway station (KTAN)
 Khathar railway station (KHZ)
 Khatian Road railway station (KNX)
 Khatlani Shaheed Halt railway station (KHSH)
 Khem railway station [closed?] (KEMK)
 Khewra railway station (KWA)
 Khewra Chemical Works railway station (KHW)
 Khichi Wala railway station (KCWL)
 Khjdabad railway station (KBW)
 Khjman railway station (KQM)
 Khnqah Sirajia railway station (KQSA)
 Khokhropar railway station (KRB)
 Khost railway station (KOS)
 Khudabad railway station
 Khudian Khas railway station (KHUK)
 Khudozai railway station (KZD)
 Khundda Ladheke railway station (KDLE)
 Khushab Junction railway station (KHB)
 Khushal Garh railway station [closed] (KHG)
 Khushhal railway station (KHLK)
 Kiamari railway station (KMR)
 Kila Abdulla railway station (KAB)
 Kila Dewa Singh railway station (KWS)
 Kila Saifullah railway station (KSFL)
 Kila Sobha Singh railway station (QSB)
 Kinjhejhi railway station (KNJE)
 Kirdagap railway station (KDB)
 Kiridhor railway station (KIO)
 Kishingi railway station (KNV)
 Kissan railway station (KFS)
 Kobar railway station (KBO)
 Koh-I-Noor railway station (KONR)
 Kohat Cant railway station (KHCT)
 Kohat Tehsil railway station (KHTL)
 Kohsar railway station (KOSR)
 Kolpur railway station (KLR)
 Korangi railway station (KRNG)
 Kot Abadan Halt railway station (KABN)
 Kot Abbas Shaheed railway station [closed] (KJMR)
 Kot Adu Junction railway station (ADK)
 Kot Behram railway station (KTBM)
 Kot Chhutta railway station (KOHT)
 Kot Chhutta railway station (KOHT)
 Kot Darya Bal railway station (KTDB)
 Kot Daya Kishen railway station (KVW)
 Kot Ghulam Muhammad railway station (KGM)
 Kot Haji Shah Halt railway station (KHJS)
 Kot Khair Din Halt railway station (KKDN)
 Kot Lakhpat railway station (LKP)
 Kot Lalloo railway station (KQO)
 Kot Mul Chand railway station (KMCD)
 Kot Najib Ullah railway station (KJQ)
 Kot Pir Abdul Aziz Halt railway station (KPAA)
 Kot Radha Kishn railway station (KRK)
 Kot Salim Shahid railway station (KSHD)
 Kot Sultan railway station (KTS)
 Kot-Lalloo railway station (KQO)
 Kotla Adib Shahid railway station (KASD)
 Kotla Isan railway station (KTIN)
 Kotla Jam railway station (KJO)
 Kotla Laghari Halt railway station (KLRI)
 Kotla Nasir railway station (KNIR)
 Kotla Pathan railway station (KLF)
 Kotri Junction railway station (KOT)
 Kotsamaba railway station (KTSB)
 Kuchali railway station (KCL)
 Kuchlak railway station (KCK)
 Kuhi-Taftan railway station (TFT)
 Kul Mokal railway station (KXU)
 Kulab railway station (KBB)
 Kundian Junction railway station (KDA)
 Kunri railway station (KNRS)
 Kuram Bridge railway station (KMB)
 Kussam railway station (KMSR)
 Kutabpur railway station (KUZ)
 Kutal Imara railway station (KTAM)
 Kutbal railway station (KTB)
 Lahore Cant railway station (LRC)
 Lahore Junction railway station (LHR)
 Lakha Road railway station (LKRD)
 Lakhnewala Halt railway station (LKWL)
 Laki Ghulam Shah Halt railway station (LGLS)
 Laki Marwat Junction railway station (LMW)
 Laki Shah Saddar railway station (LSS)
 Lal Mir Halt railway station (LM)
 Lal Pir railway station (LLPR)
 Lal Suhanra railway station (LSA)
 Lala Musa Junction railway station (LLM)
 Lalamusa Goods railway station (LLMG)
 Laleji railway station (LJI)
 Lalian railway station (LLAN)
 Landhi Junction railway station (LND)
 Landi Khana railway station [closed]
 Landi Kotal railway station (LKL)
 Landi Kotal railway station (LDKN)
 Langar railway station (LGR)
 Langowal Baruhi Halt railway station (LBU)
 Lar railway station (LAZ)
 Larkana Junction railway station (LRK)
 Lashari railway station [closed] (LSH)
 Latif Abad railway station (LFD)
 Latif Chang railway station (LTFC)
 Lawrencepur railway station (LRP)
 Layari railway station (LYR)
 Leiah railway station (LAH)
 Liaqatabad railway station (LQD)
 Liaquatpur railway station (LQP)
 Lilla railway station (LLA)
 Lilla Town railway station (LLT)
 Lindsay railway station (LDS)
 Lodhran Junction railway station (LON)
 Lohi Bhir railway station (LBR)
 Ludewala railway station (LDWL)
 Lundo railway station (LDO)
 Mach railway station (MCH)
 Machhianwala railway station (MCW)
 Machhike railway station (MCK)
 Machi Goth railway station (MGQ)
 Machur railway station (MCHR)
 Madali railway station (HDI)
 Madeji Road railway station (MJI)
 Madharian Wala railway station (MRW)
 Madina-Tul-Hijjaj railway station (MTHJ)
 Madrisa railway station (MEE)
 Magneja railway station (MGNJ)
 Mahesar railway station (MHS)
 Mahiota railway station (MHM)
 Mahmud Kot railway station (MHK)
 Mahmunwali railway station (MMW)
 Mahrabpur Junction railway station (MHR)
 Maibal railway station (MBX)
 Mailsi railway station (MSX)
 Majladad railway station (MLDO)
 Makhad Road railway station (MBR)
 Makhdum Sahib Halt railway station (MKMS)
 Makhdumpur Pahoran railway station (MDO)
 Malakwal Junction railway station (MKW)
 Malir railway station (MXB)
 Malir Cant railway station (MXBC)
 Malir Colony railway station (MXBH)
 Matli railway station (MTX)
 Mamu Kanjan railway station (MMX)
 Mancher Chatta railway station (MNCH)
 Mandi Ahmed Abad railway station (MADD)
 Mandi Baha-Ud-Din railway station (MBDN)
 Mandi Burewala railway station (MBWL)
 Mandi Rahme Shah railway station (CRHH)
 Mandi Sadiq Ganj Junction railway station (MSQJ)
 Mando Dairo railway station (MDZ)
 Mandra Junction railway station (MNA)
 Manga railway station (MNGA)
 Manghopir railway station (MGHO)
 Mangoli railway station (MLE)
 Manguana Halt railway station (MGA)
 Manjhand railway station (MJD)
 Manjhla Bagh railway station (MNLB)
 Mankiala railway station (MKE)
 Mansurabad railway station (MMBD)
 Mansurwali railway station (MNW)
 Mardan Junction railway station (MDX)
 Margala railway station (MGLA)
 Marh Balochan railway station (MBN)
 Mari Indus railway station (MAT)
 Mariyal railway station (MRYL)
 Marshalling Yard Pipri railway station (PIE)
 Mashori Sharif railway station (MHSR)
 Massan railway station (MSY)
 Mastung Road railway station (MUF)
 Masud Akhtar Shahid railway station (MAAS)
 Matapan railway station (MTPN)
 Mauladad railway station
 Maulviwla railway station (MLVA)
 Mbwn railway station (MBWN)
 Medanak railway station (MDNK)
 Mehar-Shah railway station (MEHA)
 Mehta Suja railway station (MSJ)
 Melta railway station (MTS)
 Meting railway station (MTG)
 Mhn railway station (MHN)
 Mian Channun railway station (MYH)
 Mian Ghundi railway station (MUI)
 Mian Shamir railway station (MSHR)
 Mian Wali railway station (MWI)
 Miani railway station (MII)
 Mihran Halt railway station (MINT)
 Miman railway station (MMN)
 Mina Bazar railway station (MNBZ)
 Minchinabad railway station (MCD)
 Minhan Khan Rind Halt railway station (MHKD)
 Mir Allah Dad Talpur Halt railway station (MIRX)
 Mir Dostali railway station (MDAL)
 Mir Hassan Khoso Halt railway station (MHKS)
 Miran Sahib railway station [closed] (MNB)
 Mirani railway station [closed] (MRNI)
 Mirdad Muafi railway station (MQD)
 Mirjal railway station (MRJL)
 Mirjat railway station (MRJT)
 Mirjawa railway station (MJB)
 Mirpur Jhas Goods railway station (MPSY)
 Mirpur Khas Junction railway station (MPS)
 Mirpur Mathelo railway station (MRP)
 Missa Keswal railway station (MSA)
 Missan Kalar railway station (MSKR)
 Mitha Lak railway station (MTQ)
 Mitha Tiwana railway station (MTW)
 Mithan Kot railway station (KMTN)
 Mithiani railway station (MTNI)
 Mithri railway station (MIT)
 Mitti Roya railway station (MRY)
 Mlcl railway station (MLCL)
 Model Colony railway station (MDCL)
 Moengo Daro railway station (MNJO)
 Moghalpura Junction railway station (MGPR)
 Moghari railway station [closed] (MRZ)
 Mohat railway station (MHTA)
 Mohra Shahwali railway station (MSWI)
 Mohsinwal railway station (MOWL)
 Mona railway station (MOV)
 Moro railway station (MRS)
 Mubarakabad Halt railway station (MBAK)
 Mubarakpur railway station (MBK)
 Mudduki railway station (MDI)
 Mughal railway station (MGL)
 Muhammad Nagar railway station (MHNR)
 Muhammad Pur Diwan railway station (MRDN)
 Muhammad Rahim Kalru railway station (MRKU)
 Mujahidabad railway station (MJC)
 Mujaldiwala Halt railway station (MJW)
 Mulla Makhan railway station (MLMN)
 Multan Cant railway station (MUL)
 Multan City railway station (MXC)
 Mumtazabad Halt railway station (MTZB)
 Munianwala railway station (MNWL)
 Murad Chishti railway station (MRCH)
 Muradi Janjil railway station (MRDJ)
 Murghai railway station (MGHI)
 Muridke railway station (MDK)
 Musa Virk railway station (MSVR)
 Mushkaf railway station (MKF)
 Muslimaabad railway station (MLMD)
 Muslimbagh railway station (MMBH)
 Muzaffarabad railway station (MZJ)
 Muzaffargarh railway station (MZG)
 Nabisar Road railway station (NBSR)
 Nadabad railway station (NAO)
 Nafis Nagar railway station (NFGR)
 Naim Ishfaq Shahid Halt railway station (NASD)
 Najkot railway station (NKOT)
 Najrang Serai railway station (NUS)
 Nakus railway station (NKS)
 Nammal railway station (NLM)
 Nankana Sahab railway station (NNS)
 Narang railway station (NRNG)
 Nari railway station (NAR)
 Nari Bank railway station (NRB)
 Nari West railway station (NRWT)
 Narowal Junction railway station (NWL)
 Nasai railway station (NSAI)
 Nasarpur railway station (NPP)
 Nasrat railway station (NST) or Nusrat railway station (NST)
 Nasrat Khel railway station [closed] (NSX)
 Naukot railway station
 Naurang Serai Sugar Mill Siding railway station (NUSM)
 Naushahro Feroze railway station (NSFZ)
 Nautheh railway station (NUT)
 Nawab Wali Muhammad Khan railway station (NWMK)
 Nawabshah Junction railway station (NWS)
 Nawagazi railway station (NZI)
 Nawan Pind Halt railway station (NWZ)
 Nawaz Dahri railway station (NZH)
 Nazikabad railway station (NAZ)
 Nazirabad railway station (NZRA)
 New Chhor railway station (NCO)
 New Saidabad railway station (NSB)
 Nishatabad railway station (NSTD)
 Nishtarabad railway station (NSHB)
 Nizam Sama Halt railway station (NZS)
 Nizamabad railway station (NZD)
 Nok Chah railway station (NKG)
 Nok Kundi railway station (KDD)
 Noli railway station (NUK)
 Noori Lal Halt railway station (NRLL)
 Noorpur railway station (NRPR)
 Norai Sharif railway station (NRSF)
 North Nazimabad railway station (NAA)
 Notak railway station (NTK)
 Nowshera Junction railway station (NSR)
 Nur (Rawalpindi) railway station (NQU)
 Nur railway station (NUR)
 Nur Muhammad Mokal railway station (NMML)
 Nur Shah railway station (NSH)
 Nurkot railway station (NRKT)
 Nushki railway station (NSE)
 Nuttall railway station (NTL)
 Ocepur railway station (OCP)
 Oderolal railway station (ODL)
 Odhan railway station (ODN)
 Okara railway station (OKR)
 Okara Cant railway station (OKC)
 Ongar railway station (OAR)
 Orangi railway station (ORG)
 P.A.F. Halt railway station (AFH)
 Pabbi railway station (PBI)
 Pad Idan Junction railway station (PDN)
 Padag Road railway station (PGD)
 Paharpur Thal railway station (PHTL)
 Pai Khel railway station (PIK)
 Paigah railway station (PGHA)
 Pain Mall railway station (PJM)
 Pakhowal railway station (PHL)
 Pakka Anna railway station (PCA)
 Pakka Sidhar railway station (PKS)
 Pakpattan railway station (PPX)
 Palh railway station (PAH)
 Palijani railway station (PJL)
 Pang Pir railway station (PNP)
 Panir railway station (PIR)
 Panj Girain railway station (PJG)
 Panj Pulla Halt railway station (PJU)
 Pano Akil railway station (PNL)
 Parche-Ji-Veri railway station (PJV)
 Parkhoo Dheri railway station (PDC)
 Parvezwala railway station (PRWL)
 Pasrur railway station (PSW)
 Patla railway station (PTLA)
 Patoyun railway station (PYO)
 Pattoki railway station (PTO)
 Peeru Lishari railway station (PRS)
 Pehro Kunri railway station (PFK)
 Pejowali railway station (PJWL)
 Perak railway station (PRQ)
 Peshawar Cant railway station (PSC)
 Peshawar City railway station (PSH)
 Peshi railway station (PSI)
 Pezu railway station (PZU)
 Phularwan railway station (PHW)
 Phulji railway station (PHJ)
 Piaro Goth railway station (PRX)
 Pind Dadn Khan railway station (PDK)
 Pind Mukko railway station (PIM)
 Pindi Rasul railway station (PNRS)
 Pindora railway station (PIND)
 Piplan railway station (PPL)
 Pir Bakhir railway station (PBKR)
 Pir Barkhuradar Halt railway station (PRBR)
 Pir Jand Halt railway station (PJND)
 Pir Jewan Sultan railway station (PJS)
 Pir Katpar railway station (POP)
 Pir Mahal railway station (PMX)
 Pir Muhammad Metlo Halt railway station (PLMO)
 Pir Mukhtiarwala Halt railway station (PMTW)
 Pir Piai railway station (PII)
 Pir Sadiq Shah Halt railway station (PRSQ)
 Piran Ghaib railway station (PGB)
 Pirawalla railway station (PRW)
 Pishok railway station [closed] (POK)
 Pithoro Junction railway station (PHO)
 Pithu Rana Halt railway station (PITH)
 Prem Nagar railway station (PNX)
 Qadirabad railway station [closed] (QDB)
 Qaidabad railway station (QDG)
 Qaimpur railway station (QMP)
 Qalat-I-Nasir railway station (QNR)
 Qasimwala railway station (QSM)
 Qila Sattar Shah railway station (QSS)
 Qila Sheikhupura Junction railway station (QSP)
 Qudrat railway station (QDT)
 Qudratabad railway station (QDTB)
 Quetta railway station (QTA)
 Rabwah railway station (RBW)
 Radhan railway station (RDH)
 Radkhanwala railway station (RKW)
 Rafiqabad railway station (RFQ)
 Rafiqabad railway station (RQW)
 Rahim Yar Khan railway station (RYK)
 Rahmgul railway station (RHM)
 Rahuja railway station (RHJA)
 Rahuki railway station (RHK)
 Raina railway station [closed] (RIN)
 Raisalpur Cant railway station (RCS)
 Raisan railway station (RSN)
 Raiwind Junction railway station (RND)
 Raja Jang railway station (RJJ)
 Rajan Shah railway station (RJSH)
 Rajanpur railway station (RJPR)
 Rajar railway station (RJH)
 Rajput Nagar railway station (RPNG)
 Rakh Rajar railway station (RAR)
 Ran Pethani railway station (RPN)
 Ranbirsinghpura railway station [closed] (RSP)
 Ranipur Riyasat railway station (RAN)
 Rashidabad Halt railway station
 Rashkai railway station (RSK)
 Ratanabad railway station (RAD)
 Ratial railway station (RTL)
 Rattan Halt railway station (RTN)
 Ratto Kala railway station (RTK)
 Rawalpindi railway station (RWP)
 Raya Khas railway station (RKHS)
 Reception Yard railway station (RYD)
 Reg-I-Malik railway station (RGC)
 Rehana railway station (RCN)
 Rehmani Nagar railway station (RMNR)
 Rehmanpura Halt railway station (RMPR)
 Renala Khurd railway station (RKQ)
 Reti railway station (RTE)
 Riazabad railway station (RZD)
 Risalewala railway station (RSE)
 Rivaz East Bank railway station (REB)
 Rivaz West Bank railway station (RWB)
 Rohri Junction railway station (ROH)
 Roshanabad railway station (RSB)
 Rojhan railway station (RON)
 Ruk railway station (RUK)
 Rukanpur railway station (RKU)
 Rumian railway station (ROM)
 Rurala Road railway station (RRLN)
 Rustam Sargana railway station (RMG)
 Sabzazar railway station (SBZR)
 Sachcha Sauda railway station (SCS)
 Sada Sawaya Halt railway station (SDYA)
 Sadhar Halt railway station (SADR)
 Sadhoke railway station (SDQ)
 Sadikabad railway station (SDK)
 Sadiq Ali Shaheed railway station (SDAS)
 Sadiqpur railway station (SFP)
 Saduro railway station (SDRO)
 Safdarabad railway station (SFRD)
 Sahianwala railway station (SAHW)
 Sahiwal railway station (SWAL)
 Sahja railway station (SJH)
 Sahowala railway station (SLA)
 Sahu railway station [closed] (SUH)
 Saindad railway station (SAND)
 Sakhi Shauq Ilahi railway station (SQT)
 Sakrand Junction railway station (SKRD)
 Salih Bhambro railway station (SLBO)
 Salim Awan railway station (SLAW)
 Samanabad railway station (SMBD)
 Samandwala railway station (SMW)
 Samaro Road railway station (SAMR)
 Samasata Junction railway station (SMA)
 Sambrial railway station (SMB)
 Samiah railway station (SMTH)
 Samungli Road railway station (SMGD)
 Sanawan railway station (SNW)
 Sandral railway station (SNRL)
 Sangi railway station (SGI)
 Sangjani railway station (SJI)
 Sangla Hill Junction railway station (SLL)
 Sanjwal railway station (SJU)
 Sanjwal Cant railway station (SJC)
 Sann railway station (SANN)
 Sar Dheri railway station (SRDI)
 Sar Shamir Road railway station (SSX)
 Sar-I-Ab railway station (SRB)
 Sar-I-Bolan railway station (SBN)
 Sarai Alamgir railway station (SXG)
 Saranan railway station (SHO)
 Sardar Jhandir railway station (SRJR)
 Sardar Wali Mazari railway station (SWMA)
 Sargodha Junction railway station (SRQ)
 Sarhad railway station (SHD)
 Sarhari railway station (SRH)
 Sarmall railway station [closed] (SQM)
 Saroba railway station (SRBX)
 Sarwar Nagar railway station (SNRR)
 Sarwar Shaheed Halt railway station (SRSD)
 Sathoiwala railway station (STWL)
 Sattar Wala Halt railway station (SRWL)
 Savzala railway station (SZL)
 Sayid Hamid railway station (SYD)
 Sayyad Kasran railway station (SYY)
 Sehjowal railway station [closed] (SJWL)
 Sehwan Sharif railway station (SWN)
 Seni Gambat railway station (SGB)
 Seowal Halt railway station (SEWL)
 Serai Saleh railway station (SSQ)
 Seratangi railway station [closed] (STG)
 Setharja railway station (STJ)
 Shadan Lund railway station (SHDL)
 Shadia railway station (SDEA)
 Shadipalli railway station (SPI)
 Shafiabad railway station (SFBD)
 Shah Abdul Latif railway station (SDLF)
 Shah Alam railway station (SAM)
 Shah Jewana railway station (SJW)
 Shah Murtaza Halt railway station (SHMT)
 Shah Nal railway station (SFL)
 Shah Nawaz Bhutto railway station (SNBT)
 Shah Nikdur railway station (SXU)
 Shah Panjo Halt railway station (SPJO)
 Shah Sultan Halt railway station (SHUA)
 Shahbaz Khel Halt railway station (SXL)
 Shahbazwala railway station (SZW)
 Shahdadkot railway station (SDKT)
 Shahdadpur railway station (SDU)
 Shahdara Bagh Junction railway station (SDR)
 Shaheed Allah Bakhsh railway station (SHAB)
 Shahgai railway station (SHGI)
 Shahidanwala railway station (SHY)
 Shahinabad Junction railway station (SHND)
 Shahpur Chakar railway station (SPCK)
 Shahpur City railway station (SHPC)
 Shahpur Jahania railway station (SPJH)
 Shahpur Sadar railway station (SHPS)
 Shahtaj railway station (SHAA)
 Shahwali railway station (SHWA)
 Shakirabad Halt railway station (SHKR)
 Shamkote railway station (SMQ)
 Sharigh railway station (SGH)
 Sheikh Mandah railway station (SMS)
 Sheikh Wahan railway station (SKZ)
 Sheikh Wasil railway station (SWK)
 Shelabagh railway station (SBA)
 Sher Shah Junction railway station (SSH)
 Shikarpur railway station (SHP)
 Shina Khewra railway station (SK)
 Shinkai railway station (SNKI)
 Shori railway station (SHQ)
 Shori Chatta railway station (SHOA)
 Shorkot Cant. Junction railway station (SKO)
 Shujabad railway station (SJB)
 Sialabad railway station (SLBD)
 Sialkot Cant railway station (SLKC)
 Sialkot Junction railway station (SLK)
 Sibi Junction railway station (SIB)
 Sidki railway station [closed] (SDX)
 Signal railway station (SIV)
 Sihala railway station (SIH)
 Sihar railway station (SHS)
 Sillanwali railway station (SWY)
 Silra Shahdadkot railway station (SDKT)
 Simzai railway station (SZI)
 Sind University railway station (SDUT)
 Sinjhoro railway station (SIJ)
 Sirajwala railway station (SRJW)
 Site railway station (SITE)
 Skhakot railway station (SKC)
 Sobha Wala railway station (SAX)
 Sobhaga railway station (SBQ)
 Sodhra Kopra railway station (SDA)
 Sohan Bridge railway station (SON)
 Sohawa railway station (SHA)
 Sood Bidhana railway station (SDBA)
 Spezand Junction railway station (SZD)
 Spin Ghundi railway station (SPH)
 Spintangi railway station (SPG)
 Srirampura railway station (SRPA)
 Stores Pura railway station (AAAA)
 Suchetgarh Jn. railway station [closed] (SCG)
 Sufiabad railway station (SFB)
 Sugar Mill Halt railway station (SRMY)
 Sukh Beas railway station (SKBS)
 Sukheke railway station (SKE)
 Sukhio Manahejo railway station (SKMJ)
 Sukho railway station (SQZ)
 Sukkur railway station (SUK)
 Sulaimanabad railway station (SLMA)
 Sultan Karori Halt railway station (SLNK)
 Sultan Khel railway station (STKI)
 Sultan Nagar railway station (SLNR)
 Sultanabad railway station (SULB)
 Sultanabad Colony Halt railway station (SLDC)
 Sultankot railway station (SOK)
 Sultanpur railway station (SLPR)
 Sumar Chandio Halt railway station (SRCD)
 Sumbal Hamid railway station (SLHD)
 Sunehri railway station (SNRI)
 Surain railway station (SURN)
 Tabruk railway station (TBRQ)
 Tajpur Nasarpur Road railway station (TJNR)
 Takht Mahal railway station (TKM)
 Takht-I-Bhai railway station (TEB)
 Talhar railway station (THRS)
 Talhi railway station (TAH)
 Taloo railway station (TLQ)
 Tamewali railway station (TMW)
 Tandliawala railway station (TLW)
 Tando Adam Junction railway station (TDM)
 Tando Alahyar railway station (TDA)
 Tando Jam railway station (JTD)
 Tando Jam College Halt railway station (TJR)
 Tando Jan Muhammad railway station (TJMD)
 Tando Muhammad Khan railway station (TMN)
 Tando Mustikhan railway station (TMK)
 Tando Sarwar railway station (TSU)
 Tandoi railway station (TDIA)
 Tanduri railway station (TDI)
 Tang Haiderzai railway station (THZ)
 Tank Junction railway station (TNC)
 Taqipur railway station (TQPR)
 Taragarh railway station (TRX)
 Tarinda railway station (TRD)
 Tariqabad railway station (TQD)
 Tarki railway station (TRI)
 Taru Jabba railway station (TAJ)
 Tasirabad railway station (TASD)
 Tatipur railway station [closed] (TPR)
 Taunsa Barrage railway station (PBQ)
 Taunsa-Barrage railway station (TBQ)
 Taunsa Barrage Colony railway station (TBC)
 Tawari railway station (TWR)
 Taxila Cant railway station (TXLC)
 Taxila Junction railway station (TXL)
 Tehsil Shakargarh railway station (SKGR)
 Thal And Out Agency railway station (THAL)
 Thanedarwala railway station (TWO)
 Tharushah Junction railway station (TRSH)
 Thatta Mahla railway station (TTM)
 Theri Sansi railway station (TSE)
 Thermal Power Station railway station (TPS)
 Thole Produce Yard railway station (TPX)
 Thul Nao (Jacobabad) railway station (THLS)
 Thul-Nao railway station (THLN)
 Tibba Alamgir Halt railway station (TBGR)
 Tibba Meharban Shah Halt railway station (TIB)
 Tibbi Izzat railway station (TZT)
 Tilkan railway station [closed] (TKX)
 Tinoka railway station (TINK)
 Toba Tek Singh railway station (TTSG)
 Tobah railway station (TOBA)
 Togh railway station (TOG)
 Toraghbargi railway station (TRQ)
 Torra Tigga railway station (TRTG)
 Tozghi railway station (TZG)
 Trag railway station (TGX)
 Tufail Shahid Halt railway station (TESD)
 Uchhri railway station (UHI)
 Ugoke railway station (UGE)
 Umid Ali Junejo railway station (UAJ)
 Umn railway station (UMN)
 Unarpur railway station (UNR)
 Unharwah railway station (URW)
 Urdu College railway station (URD)
 Usman Khattar railway station (UKT)
 Usmanwala railway station (UMW)
 Usta Muhammad railway station (UTM)
 Ustarzai railway station (UTZ)
 Utram railway station (OTR)
 Vakilwala railway station (VKW)
 Vasar Bah railway station (VSB)
 Vihari railway station (VHR)
 Wadala Cheema Halt railway station (WDC)
 Wagha railway station (VWGH)
 Wagha railway station (WGH)
 Wah railway station (WAH)
 Wah Cant railway station (WHC)
 Wahab Shah railway station (WHB)
 Walhar railway station (WLR)
 Wali Khan railway station (WLN)
 Wali Mazari railway station (WMA)
 Walton railway station (WTNS)
 Wan Adhan railway station (WNAD)
 Wanbhacharan railway station (WBN)
 Warburton railway station (WRN)
 Warechah railway station (WCH)
 Waris Ali Shaheed railway station (WSS)
 Waryam railway station (WYM)
 Wazir Mansion railway station (WZN)
 Wazirabad Junction railway station (WZD)
 Wazirani railway station [closed] (WZI)
 Wegowal railway station (WGWL)
 Wil Sonpur railway station (WSN)
 Yadgar railway station [closed] (UDR)
 Yakmach railway station (YMC)
 Yar Muhammad Kalhoro Halt railway station (YMK)
 Yaru railway station (ZKZ)
 Yousaf Shah Halt railway station (YSF)
 Yru Khosa railway station (YAA)
 Yusafwala railway station (YSW)
 Zafar Iqbal railway station (ZBL)
 Zafarwal railway station (ZFW)
 Zahidan railway station (ZHN)
 Zahir Pir railway station (ZRP)
 Zahirnagar railway station (ZBA)
 Zangiabad railway station (ZGB)
 Zardalu railway station (ZLU)
 Zarghun railway station (ZGH)
 Zarif Shaheed railway station (ZRSD)
 Zeal Pak railway station (ZPK)
 Zero Point railway station (ZPT)
 Zhob railway station (ZHOB)
 Zintara railway station (ZTA)
 Zorgarh railway station (ZRG)
 Zozlan railway station (ZZN)

See also 

 Transport in Pakistan
 List of railway lines in Pakistan

References 

Railway stations
Pakistan
Railway stations